The TCA Award for Outstanding New Program is an award given by the Television Critics Association.

Winners and nominees

Total awards by network

 NBC – 5
 Fox – 4
 HBO – 4
 ABC – 2
 AMC – 2
 Netflix – 2
 Apple TV+ – 1
 BBC America – 1
 FX – 1
 Showtime – 1
 USA – 1
 The WB – 1

Total nominations by network

 HBO – 18
 ABC – 15
 Fox – 15
 NBC – 15
 FX – 12
 Netflix – 12
 CBS – 8
 AMC – 5
 Apple TV+ – 4
 Showtime – 4
 The WB – 4
 Comedy Central – 3
 The CW – 3
 Hulu – 3
 Amazon – 2
 BBC America – 2
 Disney+ – 2
 HBO Max – 2
 Starz – 2
 UPN – 2
 Lifetime – 1
 MTV – 1
 USA – 1
 WGN America – 1

References

External links
 Official website

New Program
Awards established in 1998